Kimaree Brian Alister Rogers (born on 14 January 1994) is a Saint Kitts and Nevis footballer who plays for Village Superstars and the Saint Kitts and Nevis national team.

International career
At the youth level Rogers played in 2011 CONCACAF U-17 Championship qualifiers and 2015 CONCACAF Men's Olympic Qualifying Championship qualifiers.

He debuted on the senior team in 2016, scoring his first international goal in a 3–0 victory against Bermuda. On 14 October 2018, he scored his second goal for St. Kitts and Nevis in the competition of the CONCACAF Nations League in a 10–0 victory against non-FIFA member Saint Martin.

International goals
Scores and results list Saint Kitts and Nevis's goal tally first.

Honours

Club
Village Superstars
 SKNFA Premier League: 2017–18, 2018–19

Individual
 SKNFA Premier League Player of the Year: 2018

References

External links
 
 
 

1994 births
Living people
Saint Kitts and Nevis footballers
Saint Kitts and Nevis international footballers
Saint Kitts and Nevis youth international footballers
Association football forwards
Village Superstars FC players
People from Basseterre